Tele 5 may refer to:
Tele 5, a German television channel
Telecinco, a Spanish television channel
Tele 5 (Poland), a Polish television channel